The Barranquitas Formation is a geologic formation in Puerto Rico. It preserves fossils dating back to the Cretaceous period.

See also
 List of fossiliferous stratigraphic units in Puerto Rico

References

 

Cretaceous Puerto Rico